Hypolepis ambigua, (commonly known as pigfern) is a species of fern that grows in New Zealand.

The fern has broad fronds which grow up to 120 cm long, the fronds have mostly colourless hairs and some brown-tinged hairs on the midribs, while the stalks have red-brown or pale-brown bristly hairs. It grows in the shade in moist soil.

References

Dennstaedtiaceae
Ferns of New Zealand
Endemic flora of New Zealand
Plants described in 1832